The following is a list of notable films that are incomplete or partially lost. For films for which no footage (including trailers) is known to have survived, see List of lost films. For films that were never completed in the first place, see List of abandoned and unfinished films.

Silent films

1890s

1900s

1910s

1920s

Sound films

1920s

1930s

1940s

1950s

1960s

1970s

1980s

2000s

See also
 List of rediscovered films
 List of films cut over the director's opposition

References

External links
 Subterranean Cinema a website about the search for lost and rare cinema
 List of lost silent films at www.silentera.com
 List of lost sound films (highlighted in red) at www.vitaphone.org
 Lost Films database

Incomplete of partially
History of film